The Panha 2091 "Toufan" is an Iranian overhaul and upgrade of the Bell AH-1J International (export version of the SeaCobra) attack helicopter purchased before the 1979 Islamic Revolution. The overhaul and upgrade program is known as project number 2091 of the Iranian Helicopter Support and Renewal Company (also known as Panha).

Design
Reported upgrades include:

 new cockpit armored panels
 new, Iranian-designed canopy
 new avionics
 nose-mounted camera
 new cockpit design

The upgraded attack helicopter has a narrower airframe for greater flexibility and is armed with an M197 three-barreled 20-mm Gatling-type cannon in the A/A49E turret. Its wing-stub stations carry a pair of 19-tube 70-mm rocket launchers.

Bulletproof glass protects the pilot's cockpit and weapons officer station, internal avionics have been revamped with the addition of a GPS and receiver in the nose, and a warning radar attached to the rear, with four antennae providing 360 degrees coverage and all electronics systems integrated.

Specifications

See also

References

External links
Toufan 2

Military helicopters
1990s Iranian attack aircraft
1990s Iranian helicopters